Kuritsyn (from курица meaning chicken) is a Russian masculine surname, its feminine counterpart is Kuritsyna. It may refer to
Fyodor Kuritsyn, Russian statesman, philosopher and a poet
Svetlana Kuritsyna, Russian journalist

Russian-language surnames